The 78th Brigade was a formation of  the British Army. It was raised as part of the new army also known as Kitchener's Army and assigned to the 26th Division and served on the Western Front and the Macedonian Front during the First World War.

The 78th Brigade participated in the Battle of Doiran in August 1916, during which the 7th Battalion of the Oxfordshire_&_Buckinghamshire_Light_Infantry took Horseshoe  Hill.

Formation
 
9th Battalion, Gloucestershire Regiment
11th Battalion, Worcestershire Regiment 	 
7th Battalion, Oxfordshire and Buckinghamshire Light Infantry 	 
7th Battalion, Royal Berkshire Regiment 	 
78th Machine Gun Company 	
78th SAA Section Ammunition Column 	
78th Trench Mortar Battery

References

Infantry brigades of the British Army in World War I